Moner is a surname. Notable people with the surname include:

Dalmazio Moner (1291–1341), Spanish Roman Catholic priest
John Moner, MP for Salisbury (UK Parliament constituency)
Fernando Moner (born 1967), Argentine footballer
Isabela Moner (born 2001), American actress and singer

See also
Monet (name)